Arthur Stanley Cantrell (8 May 1883 – 22 May 1954) was an English first-class cricketer and Royal Marines officer. Cantrell was commissioned into the Royal Marine Artillery and served during the First World War. His military service with the Royal Marines lasted until his retirement in 1934, though he did later come out of retirement to serve in the Second World War. Cantrell also played first-class cricket for the Royal Navy Cricket Club between 1913–1929, making fourteen appearances.

Early life, first-class debut and WWI
Cantrell was born in British Ceylon and was educated in England at Bedford School and Bedford Modern School. He was commissioned into the Royal Marine Artillery (RMA) as a second lieutenant in August 1900. He was promoted to the rank of lieutenant in February 1903. He was made a captain in September 1911. He made his debut in first-class cricket for the Royal Navy against the Army at Lord's in 1913. Shortly before the outbreak of World War I, Cantrell played a second first-class match for the Royal Navy in June 1914, in a repeat of the fixture of the previous year. At the beginning of 1914, he had been seconded to another battalion within the RMA.

Cantrell completed his sixteen years of service during the First World War, at which point he was promoted to major in June 1917. In May 1918, he was made a brevet lieutenant colonel. He was awarded the Legion of Honour by France in June 1918.

Post-war service and later cricket
Cantrell resumed playing first-class cricket for the Royal Navy following the war, appearing for the Royal Navy against Cambridge University in June 1919. In August 1919, he made a first-class appearance for a combined Army and Navy cricket team against a team of Demobilised Officers at Lord's, during which he took his maiden five wicket haul when he took 5 for 52 in the Demobilised Officers first-innings. He continued to play first-class cricket for the Royal navy until 1929, by which point he had appeared in fourteen first-class matches for the Royal Navy. Playing as a right-arm medium-fast bowler, Cantrell took 44 wickets for the Royal Navy at an average of 27.36, with two five wicket hauls and best figures of 6 for 58.

He was promoted to the full rank of lieutenant colonel in July 1930. In October of the same year he was made the Director of Naval Recruiting. He was promoted to the rank of colonel in April 1934, with seniority antedated to June 1922. Three months later he retired from active service at his own request, and was placed on the Retired List. He came out of retirement during the Second World War, during which he was promoted to the rank of temporary brigadier in October 1941. He died in May 1954 at Black Notley, Essex.

References

External links

1883 births
1954 deaths
People educated at Bedford School
People educated at Bedford Modern School
English cricketers
Royal Navy cricketers
Army and Navy cricketers
Royal Marines officers
Royal Marines personnel of World War I
Chevaliers of the Légion d'honneur
Royal Marines personnel of World War II
Sri Lankan people of English descent